Collins' squirrel monkey (Saimiri collinsii) is a species of squirrel monkey from Brazil. It had been considered a subspecies of the common squirrel monkey (S. sciureus) until a genetic study by Jessica Lynch Alfaro et al. elevated it to species status.

Collins' squirrel monkeys eat palm fruits, legumes, insects, bird eggs and occasionally lizards.

References

Squirrel monkeys
Mammals described in 1914
Primates of South America
Mammals of Brazil
Taxa named by Wilfred Hudson Osgood